Tom Harrington (13 September 1908 – 29 November 1988) was an Australian rules footballer who played with Fitzroy in the Victorian Football League (VFL).

Notes

External links 
		

1908 births
1988 deaths
Australian rules footballers from Victoria (Australia)
Fitzroy Football Club players